Luqmaan Prince Patel (born 3 January 1993), better known as Prince Patel, is a British professional boxer who challenged for the IBO super-flyweight title in 2019. He has also held multiple regional championships, including the Commonwealth super-flyweight title since March 2021 and the African super-flyweight title in 2019. Patel is the first boxer of Indian descent to have won a Commonwealth title.

Early life 
Prince Patel grew up in West London and attended Isleworth and Syon School. He joins multiple-time Olympic champion Mo Farah, Chelsea FC and England International footballer Reece James and England International cricketer Owais Shah as notable former students who have achieved sporting success.

Boxing career
Prince Patel started his boxing journey at the age of 11 years, by competing as an amateur in the UK, where he achieved a record of 36 – 17. During this time he represented a number of amateur boxing clubs across London such as: Northolt ABC, Dale Youth, Earlsfield ABC, and Repton ABC. He had his first amateur bout at the age of 12. By the end of his amateur career, Patel had successfully won four national titles and two British titles. He also reached two national ABA finals.

Patel became a licensed professional boxer in 2015, where he signed his first professional contract with Goodwin Promotions. Patel made his professional boxing debut on 14 March 2015 at York Hall, which resulted in a knockout victory within 90 seconds. Shortly after this win, he left Goodwin Promotions by mutual consent and signed with Queensberry Promotions, and had a management deal with Hall of Fame promoter Frank Warren. 

After having a few professional boxing matches under this new promotion and management, Patel left due to a lack of fights and activity, where he had only one fight under the Queensberry Promotions banner in an eighteen-month period. Instead of seeking out a new promotor or manager, Patel proceeded to box independently and internationally.

Professional boxing record

References 

1993 births
Living people
British male boxers
Southpaw boxers
Super-flyweight boxers
Bantamweight boxers
Featherweight boxers
English people of Indian descent
African Boxing Union champions
Commonwealth Boxing Council champions